Parmeet Sethi is an Indian actor. He is best known for portraying Kuljeet Singh in his debut in Aditya Chopra's directorial debut Dilwale Dulhania Le Jayenge (1995).

Sethi has also acted in films such as Dhadkan (2000), Om Jai Jagadish (2002), Lakshya (2004), Baabul (2006), Dil Dhadakne Do (2015), Rustom (2016), Laila Majnu (2018) and Bhangra Paa Le (2020). Apart from films, he is also active in television shows and has appeared in Dastaan (1995-1996) and Jassi Jaissi Koi Nahin (2003-2006), Detective Omkar Nath (2006), Sujata (2008), Pehredaar Piya Ki (2017), My Name Ijj Lakhan (2019), Special OPS (2020) and  Hundred  (2020).

He made his directorial debut with Badmaash Company (2010) which earned him a nomination for the Best Debutante Director at Zee Cine Awards.

Life
Sethi married actress Archana Puran Singh on 30 June 1992. They have two sons, Aryamann and Ayushmaan. He is the cousin of television actress Niki Aneja Walia.

Career
Sethi made his Bollywood debut in the award winning film Dilwale Dulhania Le Jayenge (1995), portraying the role of Kuljeet Singh. The movie went onto became a commercially and critically acclaimed film. Subsequently he starred in Diljale (1996) as Captain Ranveer with Ajay Devgn and Sonali Bendre. He also starred in the critically acclaimed Punjabi language film Des Hoyaa Pardes (2004). The film won a National Award for Best Feature Film in Punjabi.

In 2005, he participated in the first season of Indian television dance reality show  Nach Baliye  with his wife Archana Puran Singh. Then in 2006, he hosted another television dance reality show Jhalak Dikhhla Jaa with his wife.

In 2010, he tried his first directorial venture, Yash Raj's Badmaash Company starring Shahid Kapoor, Anushka Sharma and Meiyang Chang, which was a success at box office earning 530 million Indian rupees. Sethi wrote its entire script with dialogues in just six days. The film received mixed-to-positive reviews from critics. Taran Adarsh of Bollywood Hungama gave it a rating of 3 out of 5, saying; "On the whole, Badmaash Company is a watchable experience for various reasons, the prime reason being it offers solid entertainment, but doesn't insult your intelligence." Rajeev Masand of CNN-IBN gave the movie 1.5 out of 5 and claimed it to be "outrageously silly". Gaurav Malani of Indiatimes gave the film 3.5 out of 5 saying "Badmaash Company is a good entertainer. Worth a watch!" and praising Shahid Kapoor. Komal Nahta gave the film 2.5 out of 5, praising the performance of Kapoor and called Badmaash Company "an entertainer". Sukanya Verma of rediff gave the film 2 out of 5 stars saying Sethi's directorial debut starts out with cocksure confidence and zing. Nikhat Kazmi of the Times of India gave the film 3 out of 5 stars and said, "Indeed, Badmaash Company does have a bunch of riveting scenes, although the story does follow a very predictable line of crime and punishment/repentance." DNA gave the film 2.5 out of 5 saying, "This company is worth keeping." Anupama Chopra of NDTV called it a "staggeringly tedious film" while Raja Sen of Rediff said, "There's not a single scene in the film that actually works". Mayank Shekhar of the Hindustan Times criticized the film as half-written; he only liked the film until the interval and gave it 2 out of 5. The film received an aggregate rating of 4/10 at ReviewGang.

In 2008, after his appearance in the film named Dus Kahaniyaan (2007), he took a break from acting to focus on writing and direction. But in 2015, he made his comeback after seven years as an actor in Zoya Akhtar directorial Dil Dhadakne Do (2015).

He has also directed some episodes of sitcom Sumit Sambhal Lega (2015). In 2017, he again directed another television sitcom Har Mard Ka Dard. It starred Faisal Rashid in lead. In 2020, Sethi appeared in Neeraj Pandey directed hotstar original web series Special OPS. In 2021, he made his Punjabi television debut with a show named Akhiyaan Udeek Diyan, which was aired on Zee Punjabi.

Filmography

Films

Television

References

External links
 
 
 

Living people
Male actors in Hindi television
20th-century Indian male actors
21st-century Indian male actors
Hindi-language film directors
Hindi screenwriters
Hindi film producers
Indian film producers
Indian television producers
Film producers from Mumbai
Indian male television actors
People from Delhi
Indian television presenters
Participants in Indian reality television series
Screenwriters from Delhi
Indian male screenwriters
21st-century Indian film directors
Male actors in Punjabi cinema
Year of birth missing (living people)